Mount Mohl is a mountain,  high, at the east side of Vinson Massif, surmounting the ridge between the heads of Dater Glacier and Thomas Glacier, in the Sentinel Range of the Ellsworth Mountains, Antarctica. It is connected to Doyran Heights to the northeast by Goreme Col.

The peak was first mapped by the United States Geological Survey from surveys and U.S. Navy air photos from 1957 to 1959, and was named by the Advisory Committee on Antarctic Names for Commander Edgar A. Mohl, U.S. Navy, who was a hydrographic officer on the staff of the Commander, U.S. Navy Task Force 43, during Deep Freeze Operations I and II in 1955–56 and 1956–57.

See also
 Mountains in Antarctica

Maps
 Vinson Massif.  Scale 1:250 000 topographic map.  Reston, Virginia: US Geological Survey, 1988.
 Antarctic Digital Database (ADD). Scale 1:250000 topographic map of Antarctica. Scientific Committee on Antarctic Research (SCAR). Since 1993, regularly updated.

References

Ellsworth Mountains
Mountains of Ellsworth Land